The 2016 Catalunya GP3 Series round was a GP3 Series motor race on 14 and 15 May 2016 at the Circuit de Catalunya in Spain. It was the first round of the 2016 GP3 Series. The race weekend supported the 2016 Spanish Grand Prix.

The round saw the début of the third-generation GP3 car, the Dallara GP3/16, which replaced the GP3/13 chassis used between 2013 and 2015.

Background
The defending champions for GP3, Esteban Ocon, were unable to defend their respective titles due to the ruling which forbids driver champions from returning to the series. Ocon served as a Mercedes development driver and was also the reserve driver for the Renault Formula 1 team, dovetailing his F1 commitments with a season in the DTM.

Classification

Qualifying
The first qualifying for GP3's third-generation car started under clear skies, with Alexander Albon taking the early lead. Jake Dennis, Jack Aitken, Kevin Jörg, Charles Leclerc, and Nirei Fukuzumi all took turns at the head of the pack, but Jake Hughes had the last word, claiming pole with a terrific lap. With teammate Jörg in second, it was a dream debut qualifying for newcomer team DAMS.

1. – Alesi failed to stop at the weighbridge after qualifying and was forced to start from the pit lane.
2. – Parry received a three-place grid penalty for impeding a rival.

Race 1
In contrast to the qualifying session, the sky was overcast and the threat of rain ever-present. A lightning start from Ferrari Driver Academy's Charles Leclerc saw him grab first place entering the first turn, while Kevin Jörg fell to fifth. After an exciting opening few laps, the field stagnated, with Leclerc edging away from polesitter Jake Hughes and teammate Nirei Fukuzumi. Further back in the pack, Jack Aitken stalled at the start, while Steijn Schothorst retired with mechanical problems. An intense battle developed between the Koiranen GP drivers, who were fighting for tenth place and the final point. Meanwhile, Leclerc continued to build a gap to Hughes, eventually recording his first GP3 win with a margin of just over six seconds. Hughes held off Fukuzumi for second, with Antonio Fuoco finishing a distant fourth. Behind them were Jörg, Alexander Albon, and Jake Dennis, who had a wild off-track moment early on at the final corner. Óscar Tunjo finished eighth, giving him reverse-grid pole for the Sprint Race, with Nyck de Vries and Ralph Boschung completing the top ten.

Race 2
Once again, the race was set up at the start, as there were no changes for position inside the top 10 after the opening lap. Óscar Tunjo made a good start from pole position, but it was Alexander Albon that took the lead with a sensational pass around the outside Tunjo in Turn 1. Another excellent start from Antonio Fuoco saw him rise to third, ahead of Jake Dennis, with Nyck de Vries and Matevos Isaakyan both making lightning getaways to be fifth and sixth, after starting ninth and eleventh, respectively. DAMS team-mates Kevin Jörg and Jake Hughes were involved in a race-long scrap for seventh, with Saturday's race winner Charles Leclerc in hot pursuit. Despite Tunjo having a pace advantage in sector one, Albon was faster in the second and third sectors of the lap, which allowed him to maintain his lead and claim a maiden victory. ART Grand Prix swept the opening weekend for the second season in a row. For the second sprint race in a row (dating back to the final weekend of the 2015 season), every driver finished the race, which was an impressive showcase of reliability from the brand-new GP3/16 car.

Standings after the round

Drivers' Championship standings

Teams' Championship standings

 Note: Only the top five positions are included for both sets of standings.

See also 
 2016 Spanish Grand Prix
 2016 Catalunya GP2 Series round

References

External links 
 Official website of GP3 Series

|- style="text-align:center"
|width="35%"|Previous race:
|width="30%"|GP3 Series2016 season
|width="40%"|Next race:

GP3
Catalunya
Catalunya